HD 23079 is a star in the southern constellation of Reticulum. Since the star has an apparent visual magnitude of 7.12, it is not visible to the naked eye, but at least in binoculars it should be easily visible. Parallax measurements give a distance estimate of 109 light years from the Sun. it is slowly drifting further away with a radial velocity of +0.65 km/s.

This object is an inactive F-type main sequence star with a stellar classification of F9.5V; in between F8 and G0. This indicates it is generating energy through core hydrogen fusion. The star is similar to the Sun, but is slightly hotter and more massive. It is about 5.1 billion years old and it is spinning slowly with a projected rotational velocity of 1.3 km/s. The metallicity of this star is below solar, meaning the abundance of elements other than hydrogen and helium is lower than in the Sun.

The star HD 23079 is named Tupi. The name was selected in the NameExoWorlds campaigns by Brazil during the 100th anniversary of the IAU. The star is named after the Tupi people, an indigenous group.

Planetary system 
In October 2001, a giant planet orbiting the star was announced. The orbit of this object is similar to that of Mars, and the presence of such a large planet would have a strong impact on an Earth-like planet in the habitable zone of this Star.

References

External links 
 
 

F-type main-sequence stars
Planetary systems with one confirmed planet
Reticulum (constellation)
Durchmusterung objects
023079
017096